Marianne Basler (born 9 March 1964) is a French actress. She appeared in more than eighty films since 1980.

Selected filmography

References

External links 

1964 births
Living people
French film actresses